Lucas de Groot (born  in Noordwijkerhout, the Netherlands), known professionally as Luc(as) de Groot, is a Dutch type designer. He is the head of the type foundry Fontfabrik, also trading as LucasFonts.

De Groot is particularly known for the very large family Thesis (a font superfamily with sans-serif, serif and monospaced designs), Calibri, the longtime default font with Microsoft Office, and Consolas. De Groot is considered an expert on using interpolative font design and stylistic alternates to develop large families with a wide range of features and languages supported.

Biography
De Groot was born in the Netherlands and studied at the Royal Academy of Arts in The Hague. He adopted the name Luc(as) on his business card after graduating as a reference to people calling him by both "Luc" and "Lucas". After having worked for a few years at Amsterdam-based design agency BRS Premsela Vonk (since 2009 called Edenspiekermann), De Groot moved to Berlin to work at MetaDesign under Erik Spiekermann. Some of his early work included alternative versions of Frutiger, which much of his work is influenced by. While working at MetaDesign he began working on the Thesis family in his spare time, a project he described as being enabled by a lack of personal connections outside work. Thesis was initially published by Spiekermann's FontShop library before he established an independent company.

De Groot's work includes commercially released fonts and also custom families for particular clients: Corpid (previously AgroSans) for the Dutch Ministry of Agriculture; SunSans for Sun Microsystems; SpiegelSans and Taz for, respectively, the German magazines Der Spiegel and die tageszeitung; and FolhaSerif for the Brazilian newspaper Folha. Some of these such as Taz have since become publicly available.

De Groot teaches at the Design Faculty of the Fachhochschule Potsdam or University of Applied Sciences in Potsdam, outside Berlin.

Fonts
Major fonts by de Groot include:
Thesis: contains the sans-serif TheSans, TheSans Mono and serif designs TheMix and later TheAntiqua
 Taz for the newspaper die Tageszeitung
 FolhaSerif
 SunSans, for Sun Microsystems
 Calibri, for Microsoft
 Consolas (2004, released 2007), for Microsoft
 Spiegel

As an amusement, de Groot also developed a number of parodic, spiky or distorted reworkings of Thesis, including Nebulae and JesusLovesYouAll.

References

External links

LucasFonts Lucas de Groot's design bureau.
Lucas de Groot home page
 Typo International lecture, 2018

1963 births
Living people
People from Noordwijkerhout
Dutch typographers and type designers
Dutch graphic designers
Dutch emigrants to Germany
Royal Academy of Art, The Hague alumni